Hadidi may refer to:

Hadidi (tribe), Arab tribe found principally in Jordan, but also in Iraq and Syria
Ismail Ahmed Rajab Al Hadidi, Iraqi politician in Kirkuk

See also
Hadid (disambiguation)
Haditha (disambiguation)